Leucinodes grisealis is a species of moth in the family Crambidae. It is found in New Guinea, where it has been recorded from Arfak Mountains. It was first described by George Hamilton Kenrick in 1912.

References

Spilomelinae
Moths described in 1912